Savage Planet may refer to:

 "Savage Planet", a PBS television special
 Savage Planet (TV series), a British documentary series produced for ITV, first aired in 2000
 Savage Planet (film), a 2006 Sci Fi channel original film
 An alternative title for the 1973 animated science fiction film Fantastic Planet